Gary Turner may refer to:

 Gary Turner (fighter) (born 1970), English mixed martial artist
 Gary Turner (musician) (born 1954), musician, composer and record company owner
 Gary Turner (basketball) (born 1945), American basketball player
 Gary Turner, founder of GT Bicycles
Gary Turner (sideshow performer) ,performer in the Circus of Horrors and Guinness world records holder